Alpo Lintamo (19 March 1933 – 18 January 2014) was a Finnish footballer. He played in 13 matches for the Finland national football team from 1955 to 1958. He played his whole career in Finland representing Vaasan Palloseura and Helsingin Palloseura.

Honours

Club
Helsingin Palloseura
Mestaruussarja: 1957
Finnish Cup: 1962

Individual
Finnish Footballer of the Year: 1957

References

External links
 

1933 births
2014 deaths
Finnish footballers
Finland international footballers
Place of birth missing
Association footballers not categorized by position